Augusto Santos is a Filipino career government official who served as acting Director-General of the National Economic and Development Authority from 2005 to 2006, 2007–2008 and 2009–2010. He was educated at the University of the Philippines.

References 

Living people
University of the Philippines alumni
People from Manila
21st-century Filipino economists
Directors-General of the National Economic and Development Authority of the Philippines
Arroyo administration cabinet members
Year of birth missing (living people)
University of the Philippines Diliman alumni